St. Joseph's School, Rush is a secondary school in Rush, County Dublin, Ireland.

References 

Secondary schools in County Dublin